L'Olimpiade is a libretto by Pietro Metastasio for an opera composed by Antonio Caldara 

L'Olimpiade may also refer to:
 
 L'Olimpiade (Vivaldi) an opera composed by Antonio Vivaldi 
 L'Olimpiade (Galuppi) an opera composed by Baldassare Galuppi 
 L'Olimpiade (Pergolesi) an opera composed by Giovanni Battista Pergolesi
 L'Olimpiade (Mysliveček) an opera composed by Josef Mysliveček 
  an opera composed by  Giuseppe María Orlandini